Poljana may refer to:

 Poljana (newspaper), published in Estonia
 Poljana, Kamnik, a village in Slovenia
 Poljana, Prevalje, a village in Slovenia
 Poljana, Požega-Slavonia County, a village in Croatia
 Poljana, Primorje-Gorski Kotar County, a village near Vrbovsko, Croatia
 Poljana, Zadar County, a village on Ugljan, Croatia
 Poljana, Zagreb County, a village near Vrbovec, Croatia
 Poljana Križevačka, a village in Croatia
 Poljana Lekenička, a village in Croatia
 Poljana, Požarevac, a village in Braničevo District, Serbia
 Poljana, Plužine, a village near Plužine, Montenegro
 Poljana, Tuzla, a village in Bosnia and Herzegovina
 Poljana, Velika Kladuša, a village in Bosnia and Herzegovina

See also
 
 Poljane (disambiguation)